Gallivan may refer to:

Surname:
Brian Gallivan, American actor, writer and comedian
Britney Gallivan (born 1985), of Pomona, California, paper-folding theorist
Craig Gallivan (born 1984), Welsh actor, played Callum Watson in Footballers Wives
Danny Gallivan (1917–1993), Canadian radio and television broadcaster and sportscaster
James A. Gallivan (1866–1928), United States Representative from Massachusetts
Joe Gallivan (born 1937), American jazz and avant-garde musician
John W. Gallivan (1915–2012), American newspaper publisher, cable television pioneer and civic leader
Jonathan Gallivan, Toronto-based producer, musician, and multi-media developer for Gallivan Media
Patrick M. Gallivan (born 1960), member of the New York State Senate and the former Sheriff of Erie County
Phil Gallivan (1907–1969), pitcher in Major League Baseball

Places:
Gallivan, Saskatchewan, unincorporated community in Cut Knife Rural Municipality No. 439, Saskatchewan, Canada
Gallivan Boulevard (Massachusetts Route 203), in Boston, Massachusetts, United States
Gallivan Center (opened in 1993), urban plaza in the heart of downtown Salt Lake City, Utah
Gallivan Plaza (UTA station), light rail station in Downtown Salt Lake City, Utah, United States

See also
Gallivant
Galvan